Brabant Lake is an Indian settlement of 102 people located in Northern Saskatchewan, Canada. Brabant Lake is 172 km northeast of La Ronge and 45 km southwest of Southend.

The community is located on the northern end of Brabant Lake near the mouth of the Waddy River and is accessed by Highway 102. A local road provides access to Lower Waddy and Upper Waddy lakes.

The community's population in 2016 was 65, composed of Cree people. 35 people declared that their mother tongue is Cree language, 25 declared English, and 5 declared both Cree and English.

The traditional name of the community in Cree is ᐑᐳᐢᑳᐏ ᓵᑲᐦᐃᑲᓂᕽ wîposkâwi-sâkahikanihk, meaning burnt area lake.

Trapping, tourism, and mining are the main industries of the area. This community is located in the Precambrian Shield.

See also
 List of communities in Saskatchewan

References 

Northern settlements in Saskatchewan
Division No. 18, Unorganized, Saskatchewan